The Athletics competition at the 2017 Games of the Small States of Europe was held in San Marino Stadium in Serravalle from 30 May to 3 June 2017.

Medal table

Participating nations

Medalists

Men

Women

Men's results

100 metres

Heats – 30 MayWind:Heat 1: +0.7 m/s, Heat 2: +0.4 m/s

Final – 30 MayWind:+0.7 m/s

200 metres

Heats – 1 JuneWind:Heat 1: +0.6 m/s, Heat 2: +0.3 m/s

Final – 3 JuneWind:-0.1 m/s

400 metres

Heats – 30 May

Final – 1 June

800 metres
30 May

1500 metres
1 June

5000 metres
30 May

10,000 metres
3 June

110 metres hurdles
3 JuneWind: +1.0 m/s

400 metres hurdles
1 June

3000 metres steeplechase
1 June

4 × 100 meters relay
3 June

4 × 400 meters relay
3 June

High jump
3 June

Pole vault
1 June

Long jump
30 May

Triple jump
3 June

Shot put
30 May

Discus throw
1 June

Javelin throw
3 June

Women's results

100 metres
30 MayWind: -0.2 m/s

200 metres
3 JuneWind: +0.3 m/s

400 metres
1 June

800 metres
30 May

1500 metres
1 June

5000 metres
3 June

10,000 metres
1 June

100 metres hurdles
3 JuneWind: -0.7 m/s

400 metres hurdles
1 June

4 × 100 meters relay
3 June

4 × 400 meters relay
3 June

High jump
30 May

Pole vault
30 May

Long jump
1 June

Triple jump
3 June

Shot put
1 June

Discus throw
3 June

Javelin throw
30 May

References

External links 
Results
Results book

2017
Games of the Small States of Europe
2017
2017 Games of the Small States of Europe